Lakemont is a census-designated place in Allegheny and Logan Townships in Blair County, Pennsylvania, United States.  It is located to the east of I-99 and is located between Altoona and Hollidaysburg. Lakemont is the location of Lakemont Park, although the address is generally Altoona and part of the "Lakemont" area actually lies within the Altoona city boundaries. As of the 2010 census, the population was 1,868 residents.

Demographics

References

External links

Census-designated places in Blair County, Pennsylvania
Census-designated places in Pennsylvania